The Humboldt squid (Dosidicus gigas), also known as jumbo squid or jumbo flying squid (EN), and Pota in Peru or Jibia in Chile (ES) is a large, predatory squid living in the eastern Pacific Ocean. It is the only known species of the genus Dosidicus of the subfamily Ommastrephinae, family Ommastrephidae.

They are the most important squid worldwide for commercial fisheries, with the catch predominantly landed in Chile, Peru and Mexico, however, a 2015 warming waters fishery collapse in the Gulf of California remains unrecovered. Like other members of the subfamily Ommastrephinae, they possess chromatophores which enable them to quickly change body coloration, known as 'metachrosis’ which is the  rapid flash of their skin from red to white. They have a relatively short lifespan of just 1–2 years. They have a reputation for aggression toward humans, although this behavior may only occur during feeding times.

This species is spreading north into the waters of the Pacific Northwest, in Oregon, Washington, British Columbia, and Alaska.

Taxonomy
The existence of this creature was first reported to the scientific world by the Chilean priest and polymath Juan Ignacio Molina in 1782, who named it Sepia tunicata, Sepia being the cuttlefish genus. The French naturalist Alcide d'Orbigny renamed it Loligo gigas in 1835. In Chile, Claude Gay, another French naturalist, obtained some specimens and sent them to the Muséum national d'Histoire naturelle in Paris, where it was determined that the species did not belong with Loligo either. In 1857 the Danish zoologist Japetus Steenstrup proposed the new genus Dosidicus to house the species.

The German zoologist George Pfeffer synonymized D. eschrichtii with D. gigas in 1912.

Common names
This species is most often known as jumbo squid in English, but has also been called jumbo flying squid or Humboldt squid, with the last name most popular in naturalist sources. The name Humboldt refers to the Humboldt Current, off the southwestern coast of South America, where it was first collected.

A general name for this species in Spanish in Latin America is calamar gigante. Local names for it are jibia in Chile or pota in Peru. They notably rapidly flash red and white when captured, earning them the nickname diablo rojo (meaning 'red devil') among local fishermen in Baja California, Mexico.

Description
They appear to be sexually dimorphic, on average the females mature at larger sizes than the males. Generally, the mantle (or body) constitutes about 56–62% of the animal's mass (which includes the fins or wings), the arms and tentacles about 11–15%, the head (including eyes and beak) about 10–13%, the outer skin (cuticle) 2.5–5.0%, the liver 4.2–5.6%, with the rest made up of the other inner organs. The gonads consist of 1.5–15.0% of the total mass. The gladius (the single inner 'bone') is 0.7–1.0%. Precise ratios depend on the age, sex and sizes of the individual squid.

They are propelled by water ejected through a hyponome (siphon) and by two triangular fins. Their two tentacles bear 100–200 suckers, each lined with razor-sharp teeth, with which they grasp prey and drag it toward a large, sharp beak.

Behavior

Humboldt squid are carnivorous marine invertebrates that move in shoals of up to 1,200 individuals.

Electronic tagging has shown Humboldt squid undergo diel vertical migrations, which bring them closer to the surface from dusk to dawn. Humboldt squid are thought to have a lifespan of about a year, although larger individuals may survive up to 2 years.

Crittercams attached to two or three Humboldt squid revealed the species has two modes of colour-generating (chromogenic) behaviour:
 The entire body of the squids ‘flash’ between the colours red and white at 2–4 Hz when in the presence of other squid, this behaviour likely represents intraspecific signalling. This flashing can be modulated in frequency, amplitude and in phase synchronisation with each other. What they are communicating to each other is unknown – it could be an invitation for sex or a warning to not get too close.
 The other chromogenic mode is a much slower ‘flickering’ of red and white waves which travel up and down the body, this is thought to be a dynamic type of camouflage which mimics the undulating pattern of sunlight filtering through the water, like sunlight on the bottom of a swimming pool. The squid appear to be able to control this to some degree, pausing or stopping it.

Although these two chromogenic modes are not known in other squid species, other species do have functionally similar behaviours.

Distribution

Recently, the squid have been appearing farther north, as far as British Columbia. They have also ventured into Puget Sound.

Though they usually prefer deep water, between 1,000 and 1,500 squid washed up on the Long Beach Peninsula in southwest Washington in late 2004 and red algae were a speculated cause for the late 2012 beaching of an unspecified number of juvenile squid (average length ) at Monterey Bay over a 2-month period.

Changes in distribution
Humboldt squid are generally found in the warm Pacific waters off the Mexican coast; studies published in the early 2000s indicated an increase in northern migration. The large 1997–1998 El Niño event triggered the first sightings of Humboldt squid in Monterey Bay. Then, during the minor El Niño event of 2002, they returned to Monterey Bay in higher numbers and have been seen there year-round since then. Similar trends have been shown off the coasts of Washington, Oregon, and even Alaska, although no year-round Humboldt squid populations are in these locations. This change in migration is suggested to be due to warming waters during El Niño events, but other factors, such as a decrease in upper trophic level predators that would compete with the squid for food, could be impacting the migration shift, as well.

A 2017 Chinese study found that D. gigas is affected by El Niño events in the waters off Peru. The squid populations cluster into groups less, and are thus more dispersed, during El Niño events. Additionally, during warm El Niño conditions and high water temperature the waters off Peru were less favourable for D. gigas.

Ecology

Prey and feeding behaviour
The Humboldt squid's diet consists mainly of small fish, crustaceans, cephalopods, and copepods. The squid uses its barbed tentacle suckers to grab its prey and slices and tears the victim's flesh with its beak and radula. They often approach prey quickly with all 10 appendages extended forward in a cone-like shape. Upon reaching striking distance, they open their eight swimming and grasping arms, and extend two long tentacles covered in sharp hooks, grabbing their prey and pulling it back toward a parrot-like beak, which can easily cause serious lacerations to human flesh. These two longer tentacles can reach full length, grab prey, and retract so fast that almost the entire event happens in one frame of a normal-speed video camera. Each of the squid's suckers is ringed with sharp teeth, and the beak can tear flesh, although they are believed to lack the jaw strength to crack heavy bone.

Their behavior while feeding often includes cannibalism and they have been seen to readily attack injured or vulnerable squid in their shoal. A quarter of squid stomachs analyzed contained remains of other squid. This behavior may account for a large proportion of their rapid growth. An investigation of the stomach contents of over 2,000 squid caught outside of the Exclusive Economic Zone off the coasts of Chile found that cannibalism was likely the most important source of food. Over half of the squids had the beaks of D. gigas in their stomachs, and D. gigas was the most common prey item. The researchers do note, however, that squids which were jigged in the light field around the survey vessel showed much more cannibalism.

Until recently, claims of cooperative or coordinated hunting in D. gigas were considered unconfirmed and without scientific merit. However, research conducted between 2007 and 2011 indicates this species does engage in cooperative hunting.

The squid are known for their speed at eating; they feast on hooked fish, stripping them to the bone before fishermen can reel them in.

Reproduction 

Female squids lay gelatinous egg masses that are almost entirely transparent and float freely in the water column. The size of the egg mass correlates with the size of the female that laid it; large females can lay egg masses up to 3–4 m in diameter, while smaller females lay egg masses about one meter in diameter. Records of egg masses are extremely sparse because they are rarely encountered by humans, but from the few masses found to date, the egg masses seem to contain anywhere from 5,000 to 4.1 million eggs, depending on size.

Relationship to humans

Fisheries

Commercially, this species has been caught to serve the European market (mainly Spain, Italy, France, and Ireland), Russia, China, Japan, Southeast Asia, and increasingly North and South American markets.

It is the most popular squid in the world, as of 2019 a third of all squid hunted is this species.

The method used by both artisanal fishermen as well as more industrial operations to catch the squid is known as jigging. Squid jigging is a relatively novel method of fishing in the Americas. It is done by handlining by artisanal fishermen, or by using mechanical jiggers. Jigging involves constantly jerking the line up and down to simulate prey, a reel with an elliptical or oval-shaped hub helps with this. Squid jigging is done at night, using bright overhead lights from the fishing boats which reflect brightly off the jigs and plankton in the seawater, luring the squid toward the surface to feed. Squids seem to like to strike at the jigs from adjacent shadowed areas, especially the shade under the hull of the boat. Often as many as 8 to 12 jigs are on snoods on one handline, and many more are used on automated squid jigging systems. The lines are hung anywhere from 10 to 100m in depth, depending on the power of the lamps used.

The jigs are called poteras in Spanish. Different types of jigs are suitable for either handlining or for mechanical jigging for jumbo squid. They are made from bakelite and/or stainless steel, and measure 75 to 480mm in length. Jigs can have a single axis, or one to three 'arms' (ejes) which wave around when the jig is jerked, and a series of crowns (coronas) of bristle-like wire-hooks, the hooks lacking barbs, making up the tail. The body of the jigs is usually phosphorescent, but glow-in-the-dark lures may be attached to them. Jigs are extremely selective, not only can one type of jig attract only squid, often the jigs can select for a single species of squid, and even specific sizes of that species. The more arms and crowns, the more hooks, the higher the chances of snagging and actually reeling in the squid.

Since the 1990s, the most important areas for landings of Humboldt squid are Chile, Mexico, and Peru (122–297, 53–66, and 291–435 thousand tonnes, respectively, in the period 2005–2007).

Based on 2009 national fisheries data, in Mexico this species represents 95% of the total recorded catch of squid. 88% of this is caught off the coasts of Sonora and Baja California Sur.

As food

Because the flesh of the animals is saturated with ammonium chloride (salmiak), which keeps them neutrally buoyant in seawater, the animal tastes unpleasantly salty, sour, and bitter when fresh. To make the squid more palatable for the frozen squid market, freshly caught Humboldt squid are commercially processed by first mechanically tenderizing them, dropping them in icy water with 1% mixture of lactic and citric acid for three hours, then washed, then soaked in another vat with a 6% brine solution for three hours. There is also a method for home cooks to neutralize the unpleasant taste.

Compared to other types of seafood, Humboldt squid is inexpensive in Pacific South America, retailing around US$0.30/kg in Peru, and about US$2.00/kg in Chile, in the early 2010s.

In Chile the squid is eaten in chupes and paila marina. In Peru, the practice of making ceviche from cheap squid began in the poorer parts of Lima when the meat became available in the 1990s, and has since spread to Cuzco. It is sold on the street in food carts, as well as cevicherias, restaurants dedicated to this cuisine. In the United States it is made into 'squid steaks'.

Aggression toward humans
Numerous accounts have the squid attacking fishermen and divers. Their coloring and aggressive reputation have earned them the nickname diablos rojos (red devils) from fishermen off the coast of Mexico, as they flash red and white when struggling on a line.

Although Humboldt squid have a reputation of being aggressive toward humans, some disagreement exists on this subject. Research suggests these squid are aggressive only while feeding; at other times, they are quite passive. Some scientists claim the only reports of aggression toward humans have occurred when reflective diving gear or flashing lights have been present as a provocation. Roger Uzun, a veteran scuba diver and amateur underwater videographer who swam with a swarm of the animals for about 20 minutes, said they seemed to be more curious than aggressive. In circumstances where these animals are not feeding or being hunted, they exhibit curious and intelligent behavior.

Recent footage of shoals of these animals demonstrates a tendency to meet unfamiliar objects aggressively. Humboldt squid have also been observed engaging in swarm behavior when met by the lights of submersibles, suggesting that they may follow or are attracted to light. Reports of recreational scuba divers being attacked by Humboldt squid have been confirmed.

Model organism for early Marine Science in Latin America 
In Chile, at the end of the 50s and early 60s, electrophysiological and neurophysiological studies were carried out by the Montemar Institute of Marine Biology, in Valaparaiso, Chile. The remarkable size of the squid giant axon and squid giant synapse possessed by the Humboldt squid made it ideal for manipulative work in the laboratory. This research was chronicled in the documentary

Conservation
A 2008 study predicted that ocean acidification will lower the Humboldt squid's metabolic rate by 31% and activity levels by 45% by the end of the 21st century. It also predicted that the squid wouldn't be able to spend as much of the day in deeper and colder waters, as a larger proportion of the ocean would fall into the oxygen minimum zone.

A more recent study, however, provided empirical and theoretical evidence that the squid metabolism was unaffected by ocean acidification.

In popular media
The Humboldt squid was featured in the final episode of the 2009 BBC's Last Chance to See with Stephen Fry and Mark Carwardine. The episode was about blue whales, but the presenters interviewed fishermen who talked about the exploding diablo rojo population in the Sea of Cortez and human attacks, and showed a squid trying to take a bite of a protectively clad forearm.

In 2016 the squid featured in various television shows. Man Eating Super Squid: A Monster Invasion on the National Geographic Wild channel explored various attacks by Humboldt squid in Mexico. In the show, the squid is referred to as a real-life kraken and as "a global threat". The second show was River Monsters: Devil of the Deep, where show host Jeremy Wade talks to fishermen allegedly attacked by the squid in the Sea of Cortez, and then catches the animals off the coast of Peru. In the British Fishing Impossible, chain mail-clad divers plan to capture a Humboldt squid by hand in the Pacific Ocean, but are prevented from doing so due to bad weather. In BBC Earth's Blue Planet II the squid's cannibalistic pack hunting was captured on film for the first time.

See also
Cephalopod size
Colossal squid
Giant squid
Thysanoteuthis rhombus
Squid as food
 William Gilly§Humboldt squid

References

External links

 SQUID4KIDS free of charge squid for dissection, Gilly Lab
 Squidfish.net, forum on all things squid

Squid
Molluscs of the Pacific Ocean
Marine molluscs of North America
Cephalopods of North America
Cephalopods of South America
Molluscs of Chile
Fauna of California
Molluscs of Mexico
Invertebrates of Peru
Fauna of Tierra del Fuego
Cephalopods described in 1835